Mount Baldwin is a  mountain summit located in the Sierra Nevada mountain range in Mono County of northern California, United States. It is situated in the John Muir Wilderness on land managed by Inyo National Forest. The nearest higher neighbor is Red Slate Mountain,  to the south-southwest. Baldwin ranks as the 257th highest summit in California. The first ascent of the summit was made July 2, 1928, by Norman Clyde, who is credited with 130 first ascents, most of which were in the Sierra Nevada.

Climate
Mount Baldwin is located in an alpine climate zone. Most weather fronts originate in the Pacific Ocean, and travel east toward the Sierra Nevada mountains. As fronts approach, they are forced upward by the peaks, causing them to drop their moisture in the form of rain or snowfall onto the range (orographic lift). Precipitation runoff from the mountain drains east to Crowley Lake via McGee Creek, and west into Convict Creek, thence Convict Lake.

Gallery

See also

 List of mountain peaks of California

References

External links
 Weather forecast: Mount Baldwin
 Summit view (photo): Flickr

Inyo National Forest
Mountains of Mono County, California
Mountains of the John Muir Wilderness
North American 3000 m summits
Mountains of Northern California
Sierra Nevada (United States)